Jean-François Davy (born 3 May 1945) is a French film producer, director, screenwriter and actor. He directed the 1978 film Surprise Sock, which starred Anna Karina.

Selected filmography
 Bananes mécaniques (1973)
 Surprise Sock (1978)

References

External links

1945 births
Living people
French film producers
French film directors
French male screenwriters
French screenwriters
French male film actors
Male actors from Paris